UWA-001 (also known as α-phenyl-MDMA and methylenedioxymephenidine) is a phenethylamine derivative invented at the University of Western Australia as non-toxic alternative to 3,4-methylenedioxy-N-methylamphetamine (MDMA) and researched as a potential treatment for Parkinson's disease.

It has a 5-HT2A receptor affinity of 1.2 μM (∼10-fold increase compared to MDMA), 1.3 μM for the serotonin transporter (∼4-fold decrease compared to MDMA), 13.4 μM for the norepinephrine transporter (∼26-fold increase compared to MDMA) and virtually no affinity for the dopamine transporter (>50 μM).

Unlike MDMA and para-methoxyamphetamine (but similarly to ketamine), UWA-001 increases prepulse inhibition and was therefore considered to be non-psychoactive, though it was not assayed at other binding sites. It is toxic to the SH-SY5Y cell line at high concentrations, however significantly less toxic than MDMA at all concentrations tested.

UWA-001 is structurally related to the diarylethylamines lefetamine (a stimulant and opioid) and the dissociative anesthetic ephenidine, which acts as a NMDA receptor antagonist.

See also 
 AD-1211
 Diphenidine
 MBDP (UWA-091)
 Methoxphenidine
 MT-45
 UWA-101

References 

Diarylethylamines
Phenethylamines
Serotonin–norepinephrine reuptake inhibitors
Serotonin receptor agonists